The Irish College of Ophthalmologists or ICO is the recognised body for ophthalmology training in Ireland.  Founded in 1991, it represents over 200 ophthalmologists in Ireland.  Its current president is Dr Patricia Quinlan.  Yvonne Delaney serves as Dean.

Governance
The ICO is overseen by its Council which is elected every 3 years by College members. The College also appoints a Clinical Lead for National Clinical Programme in Ophthalmology, a Dean of Postgraduate Education, and a Programme Director for Surgical Training. The business of the College is assisted by: a Manpower, Education and Training Committee; a Medical Ophthalmology Committee; an Ethics Committee; and a Scientific and Continuing Professional Development Committee.

Education
The ICO oversees postgraduate medical and surgical ophthalmology training in Ireland.  The ICO is a recognised training body of the Medical Council of Ireland.  Its remit includes approval of hospital training posts.  As part of its international activities, the College is twinned with the New England Ophthalmological Society.  In 2011, the ICO introduced an online Professional Competency Scheme, to comply with new legislation and Irish Medical Council regulations.  The ICO also collaborates with the Health Service Executive and engages in outreach and education for patients and the general public.

Training scheme
The ICO supervise and co-ordinate the two strands of the ophthalmology training programme in Ireland: Basic Surgical Training (BST) and Higher Surgical Training (HST).  Completion of a pre-registration intern year is required before applying for ophthalmology training.

Basic Surgical Training
The BST programme involves rotating through various sub-specialities.  Trainees work as Senior House Officers over a minimum of three years at hospital sites in one of three combinations:
1. South Dublin Scheme:  Royal Victoria Eye and Ear Hospital (RVEEH) and Sligo University Hospital
2. North Dublin Scheme:  Mater Misericordiae University Hospital, University Hospital Galway, and University Hospital Waterford
3. Munster Scheme:  Mid-Western Regional Hospital, Limerick and Cork University Hospital
Formal training includes use of surgical simulators, continuous assessment and a mandatory human factors course.  During the BST, trainees sit examinations at RVEEH to gain Membership of the Royal College of Surgeons in Ireland, the MRCSI (Ophth) qualification.  At the end of the BST, successful trainees receive the Certificate of Completion of Basic Surgical Training (CCBST), with which they may apply for the competitive HST programme.

Higher Surgical Training
The HST scheme is a pre-requisite for obtaining a post as a hospital consultant.  HST lasts four-and-a-half years and covers seven core sub-specialities:
 oculoplastic, adnexal, and lacrimal surgery
 cornea and external diseases
 cataract and refractive surgery
 glaucoma
 retina, vitreous, uvea, and ocular oncology
 neuro-ophthalmology
 paediatric ophthalmology and strabismus
Trainees are assessed every 6 months and in their final year must complete a fellowship exam, the FRCSI (Ophth).  This exit exam comprises a one-hour viva voce and a written test.  Successful candidates also receive the Certificate of Completion of Specialist Training (CCST).

Research
The ICO holds an annual conference where members and guests present research abstract, talks and posters. From 2000 to 2011, the annual ICO/Pfizer Research Fellowship was presented at the conference.  The award sponsored trainee doctors to undertake research in ophthalmology.  From 2013, the ICO partnered with Novartis to sponsor the ICO/Novartis Research Award. In 2017, the ICO introduced a Clinical Fellowship Bursary, in conjunction with Bayer.

Recipients of the ICO/Bayer Clinical Fellowship Bursary
2017 – Caroline Baily

Recipients of the ICO/Novartis Research Award
2016 – Sinéad Connolly and Reinold Goetz (ex aequo)
2015 – Ghaleb Farouki and Khalid Kamel (ex aequo)
2014 – Maedbh Rhatigan,
2013 – Micheal O'Rourke

Recipients of the ICO/Pfizer Research Fellowship
2011 – Conor Malone
2010 – Fergus Doyle and We Fong Siah (ex aequo)
2009 – Catherine Cleary
2008 – Kevin Kennelly
2007 – Jeremy O'Connor
2006 – unknown
2005 – Noel Horgan
2004 – Tom Flynn
2003 – unknown
2002 – unknown
2001 – unknown
2000 – unknown

Notable members
 Kate Coleman  , founder of charity Right to Sight 
 Fatima Hamroush, Libya's first female Health Minister

Presidents

References

External links
 ICO Website

1991 establishments in Ireland
Medical education in the Republic of Ireland
Organizations established in 1991
Royal College of Surgeons in Ireland
Surgical organizations
Medical and health organisations based in the Republic of Ireland